Milford Transit District is the primary provider of mass transportation in Milford, Connecticut, United States. Four routes are provided by the agency, which operate Monday-Saturday. No bus service is provided on the local routes Sundays or federal holidays.

Milford Transit District also maintains bus service on the Coastal Link route seven days a week except for federal holidays in conjunction with Greater Bridgeport Transit and Norwalk Transit District, as well as  service to and from the Milford Metro-North rail station.

Routes

Door-to-door van service
Milford Transit District operates paratransit service for New Haven county in compliance with the Americans with Disabilities Act of 1990. The service is provided to all points in Milford, and to the Bridgeport and New Haven areas. All paratransit buses are lift equipped.

References

External links

 Milford Transit

Bus transportation in Connecticut
Milford, Connecticut
Transit agencies in Connecticut